Pi4 (α-KTx 6.4) is a short toxin from the scorpion Pandinus imperator that blocks specific potassium channels.

Etymology 
The name Pi4 is the fourth toxin isolated from the scorpion Pandinus imperator, from which Pi1, Pi2, Pi3, and Pi7 have also been isolated.

Chemistry 
Pi4 is a peptide, which consists of 38 amino-acids with the following sequence:

IEAIRCGGSRDCYRPCQKRTGCPNAKCINKTCKCYGCS
 
It contains an α-helix and a β-sheet; it is stabilized by four cysteine-pairings that are crosslinked by four short disulfide bridges. The four disulfide bridges are characteristic for the α-KTX6 subfamily, while most other scorpion toxins contain only three disulfide bridges. The cysteines of Pi4 are paired in the following order: 6C–27C; 12C–32C; 16C–34C; 22C–37C.

Most disulfide bridges show a left-handed conformation, although in the disulfide bridge between 22C–37C some variation is found. Only the disulfide bridge between 6C–27C shows a right-handed conformation.

Target & Mode of action 
Pi4 blocks different potassium channels, for instance, the Shaker B, Kv1.2, and SK potassium channels.

Shaker B channel 

Pi4 binds to Shaker B potassium channels, the Drosophila homologue of the voltage-gated potassium channel Kv1.1. Pi4 reversibly blocks this channel with an IC50 of 3.0 ± 2.2 nM.

A Pi4 peptide, synthesized with a different C-terminus than the natural Pi4 (COO- instead of COH2N), shows the same binding characteristics as natural Pi4. This suggests that the C-terminus of the peptide Pi4 is not involved in the binding of Pi4 to the Shaker B channel.

The residues 26K, 28I, 29N, 33K, and 35Y might be important for Pi4's interaction with Shaker B channels, especially 26K and 35Y, which form a conserved dyad of a lysine and aromatic cluster in other potassium channel toxins. It has been suggested that the positive charge of the lysine mimicks a potassium ion and enters the pore of the potassium channel, hence occluding the pore opening and inhibiting the ion flux.

Kv1.2 channel 

Pi4 blocks the voltage-gated potassium channel Kv1.2. at low concentrations (IC50 8.0 ± 5 pM). No significant effects have been observed on Kv1.1 and Kv1.3 channels at concentrations up to 10 μm.

In the binding of the peptide Pi4 to the Kv1.2 channel, the β-sheet structure is thought to play an important role. First, the residue 35Y, located in the β-sheet structure, tightly interacts via electrostatic forces with the aromatic cluster of Kv1.2 channels (344W, 345W and 355Y). Second, the residue 26K becomes stabilized by the four carbonyl oxygen atoms located in the channel of pore formed by four Kv1.2 α-subunits  (357D). Finally, the four 332Q residues of the four α-subunits of Kv1.2 channels interact via salt bridges with four subunits of the toxin ring (composed of 10R, 19R, 30K, 33K).

SK-channel 

Furthermore, the Pi4 binds to SK channels, small conductance Ca2+-activated potassium channels. Pi4 competes with apamin, another SK-channel toxin. IC50 is 0.5 ± 0.2 μM.

Toxicity 
Scorpion venoms can be toxic for mammals, insects, and crustaceans. Pi4 is lethal in mice upon injection in the ventricular system of the brain at and LD50 value of 0.2  μg/mouse.

References 

Ion channel toxins